Qaleh Now (also Romanized as Qal`eh Now, Qal‘eh-i-Nau, Qal‘eh Nau, and Qal‘eh-ye Now; also known as Qal‘eh-ye Now Rūz) is a village in Miyan Rud Rural District, Qolqol Rud District, Tuyserkan County, Hamadan Province, Iran. At the 2006 census, its population was 1,131, in 213 families.

References 

Populated places in Tuyserkan County